The 2016–17 Drexel Dragons men's basketball team represented Drexel University during the 2016–17 NCAA Division I men's basketball season. The Dragons, led by first year head coach Zach Spiker, played their home games at the Daskalakis Athletic Center in Philadelphia, Pennsylvania as members of the Colonial Athletic Association. They finished the season 9–23, 3–15 in CAA play to finish in last place. They lost in the first round of the CAA tournament to James Madison.

Previous season

The 2015–16 Drexel Dragons finished the season with a record of 6–25 after losing to Hofstra in the 2016 CAA men's basketball tournament. The team went 3–15 in the CAA regular season, finishing 9th.

On March 7, 2016, following the end of the season, Bruiser Flint was fired as head basketball coach after 15 seasons with the team.

On March 24, 2016, Drexel announced that Zach Spiker was hired to replace Bruiser Flint as head coach.

Off season

Departures

Incoming transfers

Troy Harper and Tramaine Isabell were not eligible to play in the 2016–17 season due to NCAA transfer rules.  Both were redshirts for the season and entered the 2017–18 season as redshirt juniors with 2 years of eligibility remaining.

2016 Recruiting Class

Class of 2017 early commitments

Roster

Schedule and results

|-
!colspan=12 style=| Exhibition
|-

|-
!colspan=12 style=| Non-conference regular season
|-

|-
!colspan=12 style=| CAA regular season
|-

|-
!colspan=12 style=| CAA Tournament
|-

Team statistics
As of the end of the season. 
 Indicates team leader in each category. 
(FG%, FT% leader = minimum 50 att.; 3P% leader = minimum 20 att.)

Awards
Rodney Williams
Team Most Valuable Player
"Sweep" Award (team leader in blocks)
CAA All-Conference Third Team
CAA All-Academic Team
CAA Player of the Week
Preseason CAA All-Conference Team Honorable Mention

Kurk Lee
Assist Award (team leader in assists)
CAA All-Rookie Team
CAA Rookie of the Week (2)

Kári Jónsson
Donald Shank Spirit & Dedication Award
CAA Rookie of the Week

John Moran
Team Academic Award
CAA All-Academic Team

Austin Williams
Dragon "D" Award (team's top defensive player)

Sam Green
Samuel D. Cozen Award (most improved player)

See also
 2016–17 Drexel Dragons women's basketball team

References

Drexel Dragons men's basketball seasons
Drexel
Drexel
Drexel